Gubarev (masculine form) or Gubareva (feminine form) may refer to:

 Pavel Gubarev — Pro-Russian Ukrainian politician/separatist.
 Vitali Gubarev — Russian writer, author of Kingdom of Crooked Mirrors
 Ekaterina Gubareva - Donbass politician
 Aleksei Gubarev - Soviet cosmonaut
 Sergey Gubarev - Kazakhstani water polo player

Russian-language surnames
Surnames of Russian origin